"The Sinking of the Reuben James" is a song by Woody Guthrie about the sinking of the U.S. convoy escort , which was the first U.S. naval ship sunk by German U-boats in World War II.  Woody Guthrie had started to write a song including each name on the casualty list of the sinking.  This was later replaced by the chorus "tell me what were their names."

The song is set to the melody of "Wildwood Flower", an antebellum tune by Joseph Philbrick Webster.

Recordings
 The Almanac Singers on Dear Mr. President 1942
 Will Geer on Bound for Glory 1958
 The Weavers on At Carnegie Hall, Volume 2 1960
 Johnny Horton on Johnny Horton Sings History 1960
 Oscar Brand on Every Inch a Sailor 1960
 Kingston Trio on Close-Up 1961
 The Chad Mitchell Trio on Reflecting 1963
 Jon Mark and Alun Davies on Relax Your Mind 1963
 Cisco Houston on Cisco Houston sings the songs of Woody Guthrie 1963
 The Highwaymen on Homecoming 1963
 Pete Seeger on Waist Deep in the Big Muddy and Other Love Songs 1967
 James Talley on Woody Guthrie and Songs of My Oklahoma Home 1999
 Folk Family Robinson on Songs of America (2007).  Folk Family Robinson is Chris and Rich Robinson of the Black Crowes and their father Stan Robinson.
 Country Joe McDonald on Thinking of Woody Guthrie 1969

References

External links
 

Woody Guthrie songs
1942 songs
Songs of World War II
The Kingston Trio songs
Songs written by Woody Guthrie
Songs written by Joseph Philbrick Webster